In algebra, the distribution algebra  of a p-adic Lie group G is the K-algebra of K-valued distributions on G. (See the reference for a more precise definition.)

References 

Algebra